Cannock Chase Radio FM is a community radio station, broadcasting to Cannock Chase District in Staffordshire, England. The station's tagline is 'The Greatest Hits and So Much More!' and it has been broadcasting online since 15 November 2014 from studios in Bridgtown, Cannock.

Cannock Chase Radio launched on FM on 30 March 2018 with 89.6 MHz being used in Rugeley and 94.0 MHz in Cannock. The station started broadcasting on 89.8 MHz in November 2020 to Burntwood, Lichfield and Brownhills.

History 
Cannock Chase Radio was created by Rob, Jane, and James Hughes, who felt that the area needed a radio station of its own. Many radio stations cover the area, but they felt that the Cannock Chase District was overlooked in terms of radio. Therefore, the trio decided to launch a radio station dedicated exclusively to the area.

During September and October 2014, premises were found in Kingston Court Cannock, opposite the Electric Palace Cinema. The station has since moved to premises in Bridgtown, Cannock.

Presenters 
Presenters change from time to time; current presenters are listed on the Cannock Chase Radio web site.

Availability 
Cannock Chase Radio can be heard on FM, online, on TuneIn, on Alexa and on the stations own IOS and Android Apps.

References

External links 
 Cannock Chase Radio Website
 Cannock Chase Radio on Facebook
 Cannock Chase Radio on Twitter

Radio stations in England
Radio stations in Staffordshire
Cannock
Rugeley
Radio stations established in 2014
2014 establishments in England